The Brick Train is a brick sculpture located on the outskirts of the town of Darlington, in the English county of Durham. The locomotive is depicted as if just having exited a tunnel, with the billowing smoke typical of such an exit.

The sculpture is situated adjacent to Morrisons supermarket in the Morton Park shopping area to the east of Darlington town and in the civil parish of Morton Palms. It is hollow inside and special bricks provide gaps that enable bats to fly inside and roost. The sculpture is visible from the nearby A66 road, and was officially unveiled by Lord Palumbo of Walbrook on 23 June 1997.

The work cost £760,000, which was provided by the National Lottery Heritage Fund along with smaller contributions from Darlington Borough Council, Northern Arts and Morrisons.

References

Buildings and structures in the Borough of Darlington
Culture in County Durham
Outdoor sculptures in England
1997 sculptures
1997 establishments in England
Trains in art